A - B - C - D - E - F - G - H - I - J - K - L - M - N - O - P - Q - R - S - T - U - V - W - XYZ

This is a list of rivers in the United States that have names starting with the letter Q.  For the main page, which includes links to listings by state, see List of rivers in the United States.

Q 
Quaboag River - Massachusetts
Quaket River - Rhode Island
Quantico Creek - Virginia
Quashnet River - Massachusetts
Queen River - Rhode Island
Queets River - Washington
Quequechan River - Massachusetts
Quillayute River - Washington
Quinapoxet River - Massachusetts
Quinault River - Washington
Quinebaug River - Connecticut
Quinn River - Nevada
Quinnipiac River - Connecticut
Quinsigamond River - Massachusetts
Quittapahilla Creek - Pennsylvania

Q